Leszek Teleszyński (born May 21, 1947) is a Polish actor. In 1974 he starred in the Academy Award-nominated film The Deluge under Jerzy Hoffman.

Selected filmography
 The Deluge (1974)
 Miss Nobody (1996)

References

Polish male film actors
Polish male stage actors
Male actors from Kraków
1947 births
Living people